Rumex lunaria is a species of flowering plant in the family Polygonaceae, native to the Canary Islands. It has been introduced to Italy, Sardinia and Sicily. It was first described by Carl Linnaeus.

References

lunaria
Flora of the Canary Islands